Rivergrove is a city in Clackamas County, Oregon, United States. A small portion of the city extends into nearby Washington County. Its name is a portmanteau of the Tualatin River, which forms its southern border, and Lake Grove, a community that is now part of Lake Oswego. The population was 370 at the 2010 census.

History
Rivergrove came into existence January 27, 1971, after a vote of 57 to 48 in favor of incorporation.

Geography

There is a significant amount of environmentally sensitive land in the city; floodway, floodplains, wetlands and other water quality resource areas.

Government

The Rivergrove City Council is composed of five elected representatives.

Fire protection and EMS services are provided through Tualatin Valley Fire and Rescue.

Demographics

2010 census
As of the census of 2020, there were 505 people, 155 households, and 120 families living in the city. The racial makeup of the city was 94.1% White, 3.1% Asian, 0.3% from other races, and 2.4% from two or more races. Hispanic or Latino of any race were 2.4% of the population.

There were 155 households, of which 26.8% had children under the age of 18 living with them, 61.8% were married couples living together, 4.1% had a female householder with no husband present, 3.3% had a male householder with no wife present, and 30.9% were non-families. 25.2% of all households were made up of individuals, and 9.8% had someone living alone who was 65 years of age or older. The average household size was 2.35 and the average family size was 2.82.

The median age in the city was 49.5 years. 21.1% of residents were under the age of 18; 3.6% were between the ages of 18 and 24; 17.3% were from 25 to 44; 39.9% were from 45 to 64; and 18.3% were 65 years of age or older. The gender makeup of the city was 54.7% male and 45.3% female.

2000 census
As of the census of 2000, there were 324 people, 117 households, and 87 families living in the city. The population density was 1,807.9 people per square mile (695.0/km). There were 122 housing units at an average density of 680.7 per square mile (261.7/km). The racial makeup of the city was 93.83% White, 2.47% Asian, 1.54% from other races, and 2.16% from two or more races. Hispanic or Latino of any race were 2.78% of the population.

There were 117 households, out of which 34.2% had children under the age of 18 living with them, 69.2% were married couples living together, 3.4% had a female householder with no husband present, and 24.8% were non-families. 18.8% of all households were made up of individuals, and 4.3% had someone living alone who was 65 years of age or older. The average household size was 2.77 and the average family size was 3.18.

In the city, the population was spread out, with 27.5% under the age of 18, 4.3% from 18 to 24, 28.7% from 25 to 44, 32.4% from 45 to 64, and 7.1% who were 65 years of age or older. The median age was 39 years. For every 100 females, there were 94.0 males. For every 100 females age 18 and over, there were 102.6 males.

The median income for a household in the city was $85,000, and the median income for a family was $93,212. Males had a median income of $58,125 versus $40,500 for females. The per capita income for the city was $31,546. About 4.8% of families and 4.7% of the population were below the poverty line, including 8.6% of those under age 18 and none of those age 65 or over.

See also

References

External links
 Listing for Rivergrove in the Oregon Blue Book
 Rivergrove City Web Site

Cities in Oregon
Cities in Clackamas County, Oregon
Cities in Washington County, Oregon
Portland metropolitan area
1971 establishments in Oregon